The following is a list of political parties presently espousing a variety of socialism which have representation in national parliaments, grouped by states in which they operate. The list does not contain parties previously represented in parliaments, nor parties nominally 'socialist' but functionally upholding capitalism (e.g. social democratic parties). 178 socialist, communist and anti-capitalist parties have been elected worldwide to parliament in 84 different recognized and non-recognized states. Of the 84 states listed here, 18 of them are republics ruled by a socialist, communist or anti-capitalist party, five of them are official socialist states ruled by a communist party; four of which espouse Marxism–Leninism (China, Cuba, Laos, and Vietnam) while the fifth (North Korea) espouses Juche.

List

See also 
 List of communist parties represented in European Parliament
 List of social democratic and democratic socialist parties that have governed

Notes

References 

Communist parties
Far-left politics
Lists of political parties
Socialism-related lists